Raul Morichelli (born 25 July 2002) is an Italian professional footballer who plays as a centre-back for Greek Super League 2 club PAOK B.

References

2002 births
Living people
Italian footballers
Super League Greece 2 players
PAOK FC B players
Association football defenders